The LMHOSTS (LAN Manager Hosts) file is used to enable Domain Name Resolution under Windows when other methods, such as WINS, fail. It is used in conjunction with workgroups and domains. If you are looking for a simple, general mechanism for the local specification of IP addresses for specific hostnames (server names), use the HOSTS file, not the LMHOSTS file.

The file, if it exists, is read as the LMHOSTS setting file. A sample file is provided. It contains documentation for manually configuring the file.

File locations
Windows 95, 98, Millennium Edition
Note that  is an environment variable pointing to the Windows installation directory, usually .

Windows NT 4.0, Windows 2000, Windows XP, Vista, 7, 8, 10, Windows Server 2003, Windows Server 2008, Windows Server 2008 R2, Windows Server 2012, Windows Server 2016+
Note that  is an environment variable pointing to the Windows installation directory, usually .

See also 
 HOSTS file
 NetBIOS

External links 
Domain Browsing with TCP/IP and LMHOSTS Files
LMHOSTS File Information and Predefined Keywords Microsoft knowledgebase article
Using LMHOSTS Files on Windows NT

Windows communication and services
Configuration files